Steve Thomson (born 1951 or 1952) is a Canadian politician, who was elected as a BC Liberal Member of the Legislative Assembly of British Columbia in the 2009 provincial election, representing the riding of Kelowna-Mission. Thomson was re-elected in 2013 and 2017 and elected Speaker of the Legislative Assembly of British Columbia on June 22, 2017. He had previously served as Minister of Forests, Lands and Natural Resource Operations since 2011. Thomson resigned as Speaker on June 29, 2017, after less than a week in office, immediately following the defeat of the minority Liberal government of Christy Clark on a confidence vote.

Thomson joined the cabinet in 2009 as Minister of Agriculture and Lands and has also  served as Minister of Natural Resource Operations, Minister of Energy, as chair to the Environment and Land Use Committee and as a member of the Treasury Board.

Prior to entering politics, he was executive director of the BC Agriculture Council, general manager of the BC Fruit Growers Association and the BC Milk Producers Association, as well as director of the Kelowna Museum, the Okanagan Innovation Fund, and the BC BioEnergy Network.

Electoral record 

|-

 
|NDP
|Tisha Kalmanovich
|align="right"|5,566
|align="right"|26.07
|align="right"|
|align="right"|$21,149

|Independent
|Silverado Socrates
|align="right"|130
|align="right"|0.61
|align="right"|
|align="right"|$250

|}

References

External links 
 Constituency office
 MLA page at B.C. Legislative Assembly

British Columbia Liberal Party MLAs
Year of birth missing (living people)
Living people
Members of the Executive Council of British Columbia
People from Kelowna
Speakers of the Legislative Assembly of British Columbia
21st-century Canadian politicians